Dove is a brand owned by the  multinational consumer goods company Unilever. Dove products are manufactured in countries around the world.

The products are sold in more than 150 countries and are offered for both women and men, and babies and kids. Dove's logo is a silhouette profile of the brand's namesake bird. Vincent Lamberti was granted the original patents related to the manufacturing of Dove in the 1950s, while he worked for Lever Brothers.

Product lines 

Products include: antiperspirants/deodorants, body washes, beauty bars, lotions/moisturizers, hair care, or facial care products. Dove is primarily made from synthetic surfactants, vegetable oils (such as palm kernel) and salts of animal fats (tallow). In some countries, Dove is derived from tallow, and for this reason it is not considered vegan, unlike vegetable oil based soaps.

In January 2010, Unilever launched a men's toiletries range that was branded as "Dove Men + Care". In November 2013, Steve Bell of Macon, Georgia, won the Dove Men+Care Hair "King of the Castle Home Upgrade" contest, receiving a home upgrade and consultation with Jonathan Scott of Property Brothers.

Dove Campaign for Real Beauty 

In September 2004, Dove began its Campaign for Real Beauty, followed by the creation of the Dove Self-Esteem Project in 2006, by Geyner Andres Gaona and Amy. The campaign has been criticized as hypocritical in light of the highly sexualized images of women presented in the advertising of Axe, which, like Dove, is produced by Unilever.

Ad controversy 
In May 2011, Dove prompted criticism and accusations of racism after publishing an advert for their body wash showing three women with different skin tones side by side in front of a "before and after" image of cracked and smooth skin, with a black woman below the "before" and a white woman below the "after".

In October 2017, a three second video for Dove body lotion posted on their page on Facebook in the United States prompted criticism and accusations of racism. The video clip showed a black woman removing her T-shirt to reveal a white woman, who then lifts her own T-shirt to reveal an Asian woman. The full thirty second television advert version included seven women of different races and ages.

The ad sparked criticism, leading Dove to remove the advert, saying it "deeply regret(ted) the offence it caused." Dove further stated that the "video was intended to convey that Dove body wash is for every woman and be a celebration of diversity". The black woman in the advert, Lola Ogunyemi, said the advert had been misinterpreted and defended Dove.

References

External links 

 
 Greenpeace's Campaign Page
 

Personal care brands
Products introduced in 1957
Soap brands
Unilever brands